The 1977 German Supercup was an unofficial edition of the German Supercup, a football match contested by the winners of the previous season's Bundesliga and DFB-Pokal competitions.

The match was played at the Volksparkstadion in Hamburg, and contested by league champions Borussia Mönchengladbach and cup winners Hamburger SV. Gladbach won the match 3–2 to claim the unofficial title.

Teams

Match

Details

See also
 1975–76 Bundesliga
 1975–76 DFB-Pokal

References

Unofficial 1977
Borussia Mönchengladbach matches
Hamburger SV matches
1976–77 in German football cups